The South Eastern Manitoba Hockey League (SEMHL) is a senior men's ice hockey league in the province of Manitoba, Canada.  Founded in 1951, it is one of Manitoba's longest-running leagues.  The SEMHL is affiliated with Hockey Manitoba, the provincial branch of Hockey Canada.

Teams
During its existence, 28 different teams from across southern Manitoba have played in the league at one time or another.  Only one team, the Altona Maroons, has played every  season. Currently, the league consists of ten teams, mostly in the Pembina Valley region.

Defunct Teams

Notes

Championship
The Elmer Hildebrand Trophy is awarded to the league champion each season. The SEMHL champion qualifies for the Manitoba Senior 'A' Provincial Championship and competes against the champions from Manitoba's other senior leagues.

Only one SEMHL team, the Warroad Lakers, has gone on to win the Allan Cup.

Champions 
1951-1952 Altona Maroons
1952-1953 St. Jean Flyers
1953-1954 St. Jean Flyers
1954-1955 Altona Maroons
1955-1956 Altona Maroons
1956-1957 Winkler Royals
1957-1958 Miami Rockets
1958-1959 Miami Rockets
1959-1960 Altona Maroons
1960-1961 Pilot Mount Pilots
1961-1962 Miami Rockets
1962-1963 Miami Rockets
1963-1964 Carman Beavers
1964-1965 Miami Rockets
1965-1966 Pilot Mount Pilots
1966-1967 Carman Beavers
1967-1968 Carman Beavers
1968-1969 Oakville Seals
1969-1970 Oakville Seals
1970-1971 Winkler Royals
1971-1972 Winkler Royals
1972-1973 Oakville Seals
1973-1974 Oakville Seals
1974-1975 Altona Maroons
1975-1976 Morden Bombers
1976-1977 Carman Beavers
1977-1978 Pilot Mound Pilots
1978-1979 Morden Bombers
1979-1980 Altona Maroons
1980-1981 Carman Beavers
1981-1982 Morden Bombers
1982-1983 Carman Beavers
1983-1984 Portage Hawks
1984-1985 Altona Maroons
1985-1986 Portage Hawks
1986-1987 Portage Hawks
1987-1988 Altona Maroons
1988-1989 Winkler Royals
1989-1990 Warroad Lakers
1990-1991 Morden Redskins
1991-1992 Morden Redskins
1992-1993 Morden Redksins
1993-1994 Morden Redksins
1994-1995 Portage Hawks
1995-1996 Notre Dame Hawks
1996-1997 Morden Redskins
1997-1998 Swan Lake Cougars
1998-1999 Carman Beavers
1999-2000 Morden Redskins
2000-2001 Morden Redskins
2001-2002 Altona Maroons
2002-2003 Morden Redskins
2003-2004 Morden Redskins
2004-2005 Notre Dame Hawks
2005-2006 Carman Beavers
2006-2007 Stonewall Flyers
2007-2008 Morden Redskins
2008-2009 Plum Coulee Xpress
2009-2010 Warren Mercs
2010-2011 Plum Coulee Xpress
2011-2012 Altona Maroons
2012-2013 Altona Maroons
2013-2014 Morden Redskins
2014-2015 Morden Redskins
2015-2016 Carman Beavers
2016-2017 Notre Dame Hawks
2017-2018 Carman Beavers
2018-2019 Morden Redskins
2019-2020 finals cancelled due to COVID-19 outbreak
2021-2022 Warren Mercs

References

External links
Official Website

1951 establishments in Manitoba
Hockey Manitoba
Ice hockey leagues in Manitoba
Senior ice hockey